The 1916 United States presidential election in Kansas was held on November 7, 1916. Kansas voters chose ten electors to the Electoral College, who voted for president and vice president.

Kansas voted for the Democratic nominee, President Woodrow Wilson, over the Republican nominee, U.S. Supreme Court Justice and former New York Governor Charles Evans Hughes. Wilson won Kansas by a margin of 5.86 percentage points.

, this is the last election in which Osborne County voted for a Democratic presidential candidate, and was the last time until 2020 that Johnson County did so. It is the second of two times that Kansas has voted more Democratic than the nation, the first being 1896, as well as the only time until 2020 that Kansas has voted more Democratic than neighbouring Missouri.

Results

Results by county

See also
 United States presidential elections in Kansas

References

1916
Kansas
1916 Kansas elections